Fountains of Wayne was an American rock band that formed in New York City in 1995. The band included founding members Chris Collingwood, Adam Schlesinger, Jody Porter, and Brian Young. They released six albums from 1996 to 2011 before effectively disbanding in 2013. They are best known for the Grammy-nominated song "Stacy's Mom".

Schlesinger died of complications from COVID-19 on April 1, 2020, and the surviving members of Fountains of Wayne reunited to perform an online one-shot concert as a tribute to Schlesinger on April 22, 2020.

History

1995–2001: Early years
After Montclair-based Adam Schlesinger and Sellersville-based Chris Collingwood first met as freshmen at Williams College (where Adam joined Williams' premiere a cappella group, the Octet), they played music in various bands and eventually went their separate ways, with Collingwood forming the Mercy Buckets in Boston and Schlesinger forming Ivy in New York City. In the mid-1990s, they came together to form Fountains of Wayne, named after a lawn ornament store in Wayne, New Jersey that closed in 2009. At first Collingwood hated the name but eventually warmed to it. Previous band names included Woolly Mammoth, Are You My Mother? and Three Men Who When Standing Side by Side Have a Wingspan of Over Twelve Feet. The band cut a demo and signed with Atlantic Records, then recruited guitarist Jody Porter and still-active Posies drummer Brian Young after recording their debut album. Young got in touch with a friend who worked at Fountains of Wayne's label to see if there were any job openings, and when he auditioned for the band, they asked him to play the beat of "Swingtown" by Steve Miller Band.

Though Collingwood and Schlesinger shared cowriter credit for all original Fountains of Wayne material, for most of their career together, they wrote their songs separately. In 2005 Collingwood said, "We decided early on, it’s better to not have arguments that some bands have where someone might say, ‘I wrote 15% of that song,’ and try to figure out those numbers. It just seems ridiculous." Schlesinger added, "We just agreed many years ago that if we were to have a band we’d just split the songwriting to avoid having a conversation every time we tried to finish a song. But we really haven’t collaborated as writers in years. And that’s kind of intentional too because we didn’t want it to turn into a thing where people would say, 'Adam’s songs are like this…' We wanted the band to have an identity more than we wanted each of us to have an identity in the band."

In 1996, the band released its self-titled debut, which spawned the singles "Radiation Vibe" and "Sink to the Bottom", and the band toured the world extensively behind its debut album, playing alongside bands including The Smashing Pumpkins, Sloan, and The Lemonheads. That same year, Schlesinger wrote the Academy Award-nominated, RIAA gold-certified title song for the film That Thing You Do!.

In 1999, the band released Utopia Parkway, an album named after a road in Queens, New York. The album was a concept record that dealt with life in modern suburbia. Utopia Parkway was received well by critics, garnering many favorable reviews, and was album of the week in People magazine. The group once again toured extensively behind the album, but frustrations grew between the band and the label. The band was later dropped by Atlantic in late 1999.

The band was inactive for a period of time. Collingwood, in particular, had a difficult time coping with the band being dropped by their label. In 2004 he said, "When we got dropped from Atlantic, it's my fault that it took so long, because I wasn’t sure I wanted to keep doing it. At the end of four years of the hardest work I’d ever done in my life, more traveling and being away from my wife the whole time, I had nothing to show for it. I got back home and I had nothing. I was broke, I was demoralized, I was exhausted. I think I just needed a year to recharge my batteries."

Schlesinger cowrote many of the songs for the Josie and the Pussycats film and soundtrack, produced albums for Verve Pipe, David Mead, and They Might Be Giants, and released a third record with his other band, Ivy. Collingwood formed and fronted a Northampton, Massachusetts-based pop-country band called Gay Potatoes, and played a string of solo shows in the Boston and Los Angeles areas. Guitarist Jody Porter worked with his band, The Astrojet, alongside famed producer Gordon Raphael and keyboardist David Zhang in New York City. Percussionist Brian Young moved to Los Angeles and did session work for various artists such as producer Steve Fisk, Ivy, Heather Duby, and Greg Dulli.

2001–2013: Commercial success and breakup

The band reunited to record a cover of The Kinks' "Better Things" for the tribute album, This Is Where I Belong: Songs of Ray Davies and the Kinks, in 2001, and began to discuss plans for a new album. In 2003, the band released Welcome Interstate Managers, a successful album that spawned the hit single "Stacy's Mom", which Adam Schlesinger says was a tribute to The Cars. Initially the single stalled at commercial alternative radio in the US, but MTV President Judy McGrath championed the single's music video, a Fast Times at Ridgemont High homage featuring Rachel Hunter. Ultimately Stacy's Mom was certified gold by the Recording Industry Association of America and was nominated for Best Vocal Pop Performance at the 2004 Grammys. Another song off the album, "All Kinds of Time", was used for NFL commercial promotions during the 2005 season.

In 2005, the band released Out-of-State Plates, a collection of B-sides and two new songs, which was supported by the single "Maureen" and a limited US tour that included some acoustic-only sets, a set on PBS Soundstage, and an appearance in the American Songbook concert series at Lincoln Center. Also included on the album is a 1999 cover of the Britney Spears hit, "...Baby One More Time".

Also in 2005, Robbie Fulks released a song in honor of the band called "Fountains of Wayne Hotline".

In 2006, while on tour in Tokyo, Collingwood had a mental breakdown in which he hadn't slept for four days, experienced hallucinations for two days and didn't believe that he was in Tokyo to play in front of 25,000. The show was cancelled and Collingwood was taken to an emergency department, followed by recovery in a mental hospital after returning to the US.

In 2007, the band released Traffic and Weather, an album which included the song "I-95", which Rolling Stone named #54 of the year's top 100 songs. Collingwood had less involvement during the making of the album due to his struggles with depression and alcoholism, only managing to contribute three songs.

In 2008, Porter released his debut solo album Close to the Sun, a collection of songs he had written and recorded over a period of years in between Fountains of Wayne albums and tours.

In 2009, the band released No Better Place: Live In Chicago, a live concert DVD which included newly recorded acoustic songs. Also that year, they played a short run of full-band acoustic shows where they showcased songs from their forthcoming album.

In 2010, Fountains of Wayne commenced work on their fifth album, which was influenced by the recent acoustic tours they had done. According to Porter, "It’s a little bit more introspective and not as loud of a record as the last two. I think that came from the fact that we started last year doing acoustic-based tours because we didn’t have a record out. We wanted to get back out on tour and did it stripped-down. Overall it’s not as brash or guitar-heavy."

In 2011, the band released Sky Full of Holes, an album put out in Japan by Warner Music Japan (with two bonus tracks), Europe by Lojinx, and the U.S. by Yep Roc Records. The now-sober Collingwood once again became more involved, but this turned out to be the hardest album for them to make. According to Collingwood in 2013, "The most recent record was definitely the hardest that we've ever done. I think I'm partly to blame for that. I checked out on the previous record, so when I came back in, I had to assert myself. Every single thing about that record was a fight. It was not this blissful reconciliation that led to the release; it was a brutal thing right up to the end. We'll see what happens if we end up making another record."

The band toured Sky Full of Holes into 2012. After about a one-year layoff, they played a number of U.S. dates in September and October of 2013, on a tour with Soul Asylum and Evan Dando. They also issued one final new track in 2013, "Trucks", written and produced by Sandra Boynton for Boynton's kid-friendly various artists album Frog Trouble. The final Fountains of Wayne show took place in Minneapolis, Minnesota, on October 19, 2013.

2013–2020: Post-breakup
The band never issued an official announcement that they had broken up, but by 2016 all the members were speaking of Fountains of Wayne in the past tense. Neither Schlesinger nor Collingwood had ruled out a future reunion, but both saw the possibility as remote. "I try never to say never," Collingwood said, "but it’s staggering to think of everything that would have to happen for me to want to repeat that experience."

In 2016, Collingwood released what was essentially a solo album that was issued under the group name Look Park.  At the time of the album release, he elaborated on Fountains of Wayne's demise by saying, "When we were recording the record before the last Fountains of Wayne record, which was called Traffic and Weather, I didn't really have a whole lot to contribute to that album. I was out to lunch a little bit, mentally, and just drinking too much. And I think that the fact that I sort of removed myself from the process at that point made it really easier for Adam to take over. And when I was ready to actually make another album, you know, several years later after I'd sort of cleaned up my act, it was very difficult. It was very, very hard to get back into the position where we were equals."

Porter and Young joined Schlesinger in 2016 on The Monkees' album Good Times! and again in 2018 on the group's Christmas Party. Schlesinger produced and wrote songs for both albums.

Schlesinger and Collingwood, meanwhile, remained distant. "I don't even know where Adam lives now," Collingwood told an interviewer in 2019.

2020: Death of Schlesinger and reunion
Adam Schlesinger died of complications from COVID-19 on April 1, 2020.

The surviving members of Fountains of Wayne performed together for the first time since 2013 on April 22, 2020, as part of a charity livestream event to raise funding for the New Jersey Pandemic Relief Fund. The performance was a tribute to Schlesinger, and featured Sharon Van Etten taking his place on bass guitar.

Band members
Chris Collingwood – lead vocals, keyboards (1995–2013, 2020), rhythm guitar (1997–2013, 2020), lead guitar (1995–1997)
Adam Schlesinger – bass, keyboards, backing vocals (1995–2013), drums, rhythm guitar (1995–1997; died 2020)
Jody Porter – lead guitar, backing vocals (1997–2013, 2020)
Brian Young – drums, percussion (1997–2013, 2020)

Timeline

Discography

Studio albums
Fountains of Wayne (1996)
Utopia Parkway (1999)
Welcome Interstate Managers (2003)
Traffic and Weather (2007)
Sky Full of Holes (2011)

References

External links

Fountains of Wayne interview with Blender
Fountains of Wayne official webSite

1995 establishments in New York City
2013 disestablishments in New York (state)
Musical groups established in 1995
Musical groups disestablished in 2013
American power pop groups
Musical quartets
Alternative rock groups from New York (state)
Lojinx artists
S-Curve Records artists
Virgin Records artists
Yep Roc Records artists
Musical groups reestablished in 2020